Asaba Edson Ruyonga is a Ugandan politician who served for three terms as mayor of Fort Portal City from 2001 to 2016. Ruyonga hails from Tooro, one of the ancient traditional monarchies of Uganda.

References 

Mayors of places in Uganda
Ugandan Africanists
Living people
Year of birth missing (living people)